Palula (also spelt Phalura, Palola, Phalulo) and also known as Ashreti (Aćharêtâʹ) or Dangarikwar (the name used by Khowar speakers), is an Indo-Aryan language spoken by approximately 10,000 people in the valleys of Ashret and Biori, as well as in the village of Puri (also Purigal) in the Shishi valley and at least by a portion of the population in the village Kalkatak, in the Chitral District of Khyber Pakhtunkhwa province of Pakistan.

In some of the smaller villages, Palula has either ceased to be spoken (in the village Ghos, situated near Drosh) or its speakers are largely shifting (as in Puri and Kalkatak) to the more widely spoken Khowar language. However, in the main Palula settlements in the Biori and Ashret valleys, it is a strong, vibrant and growing language, as the population in those areas increases and it is still with a few exceptions the mother tongue of almost all people.

Palula is pronounced as /paːluːlǎː/, with three long vowels and a rising pitch on the final syllable.

Study and classification 
The Palula language has been documented by George Morgenstierne (1926, 1941), Kendall Decker (1992), Henrik Liljegren (2008, 2009, 2010), and Henrik Liljegren & Naseem Haider (2009, 2011).

It is classified as a Dardic language, but this is more of a geographical classification than a linguistic one.

Phonology

Vowels

The following table sets out the vowels of Palula.

Nasalization is found; however, it typically limited to vowels preceding sibilants and nasals and word finally.

Consonants

The consonant inventory of Palula is shown in the chart below.

 Notes

 The phonemes /ʐ, ʐʱ, ʑʱ/ have a limited distribution throughout the language.
 The aforementioned /ʐ/ phoneme appears to have an even more rare realization; ⟨ɖʐ⟩, which appears in the word ẓhaṇẓíir: [ɖʐʰaɳɖʐîːɾ], meaning chain. ⟨ɖʐ⟩ and ⟨ʐ⟩ are most likely allophones.
  The phonemes /q/ and /f/, which are only used in loanwords from foreign languages, are often realized as the native consonants ⟨x⟩ and ⟨pʰ⟩ respectively.
 The phonemic status of the voiceless aspirate and breathy voiced series are debatable. The breathy voiced series is generally considered lexical—a cluster of a consonant + /h/.
 Neither voiceless aspiration nor breathy voicing co-occur with the voiceless fricatives /(f) s ʂ ɕ x h/, the distributionally limited /ɳ ɽ/, along with the newly borrowed phonemes /ɣ (q)/ in a syllable onset.
 The phonemes /t/ and /d/ are realized as ⟨t̪⟩ and ⟨d̪⟩ respectively.
 Similarly to the ⟨ʐ⟩~⟨ɖʐ⟩ connection, the phoneme /ʑ/ is often realized with an affricate pronunciation, similar to ⟨dʑ⟩. This might be because /ʑ/ represents both ج and ژ.
 The phoneme /n/ has many different realizations depending on context. It is realized as a palatal nasal ⟨ɲ⟩ when /n/ precedes a palatal consonant. Similarly, /n/ is realized as a velar nasal ⟨ŋ⟩ when /n/ precedes a velar stop. When preceding a retroflex consonant, nasals assimilate and are thus realized as ⟨ɳ⟩. However, /ɳ/ appears to be a phoneme independent from /n/ as it distinguishes from it and can create minimal pairs such as "/kan/: shoulder" and "/kaɳ/: ear". In all other cases, /n/ is realized as its baseline pronunciation of ⟨n̪⟩, thus classifying /n/ as a dental nasal as opposed to an alveolar one.
 The phoneme /r/ is realized as a ⟨ɾ⟩, often being a tap instead of a trill.
 As with the case of Urdu, /ɽ/ cannot occur word-initially. However in Ashret, word-initially, /ɽ/ may be realized as a variation of /l/ (/lo/~/ɽo/: he, that).
 The lateral approximant /l/ is velarized ⟨ɫ⟩ if preceded by a back vowel (a, aa, o, oo, u, uu), otherwise, it's realized as ⟨l⟩. This means that the word "khéeli" is pronounced as "[kʰêːli]", but the word "khúulu" is pronounced as "[[kʰûːɫu]".
 Depending on the speaker, the phoneme /w/ can be realized as either bilabially ⟨β̞⟩, or similar to a labiodental ⟨ʋ⟩, as is the case with Urdu.

Tone

Like many Dardic languages, Palula shows either tone or, as in Palula, a pitch accent. Words may have only one accented mora, which is associated with high pitch; the remaining mora have a default or low pitch.

Writing system 
In 2004, Anjuman-e-Taraqqi-e-Palula, the Society for the promotion of Palula, was founded by people in the Palula community to promote the continued use of their language and to encourage research and documentation of their language, history and culture. After the establishment of a written form of the language, the society is now engaged in producing literature and educational material in Palula. In 2006, Palula Alifbe (Palula alphabet book) and Palula Shiluka (Palula stories) were jointly published by the Anjuman-e-taraqqi-e-Palula and the Frontier Language Institute in Peshawar.

In 2008, a mother-tongue based educational programme was launched by a local school management committee in Ashret and a first batch of Palula children could start learning to read and write in their own language. Since 2010, two schools operate within this programme in Ashret, using a curriculum developed by the community itself with assistance from the Forum for Language Initiatives (a regional language resource centre based in Islamabad).The writing system made by Anjuman-e-Taraqqi-e-Palula is as follows:

Letters

Vowels
The used of diacritics seems to fluctuate depending on the writer, however, it is almost always used when needing to distinguish from another word with similar vowels, but can be dropped otherwise.

References

Bibliography

 
  
 
 Haider, Naseem. 2012. Palula matali. [Palula proverbs]. (Maqami Zaban-o-Adab kaa Ishaati Silsila 1.) Islamabad: Forum of Language Initiatives
 
 
 
 
 
 
 Morgenstierne, Georg (1926) Report on a Linguistic Mission to Afghanistan. Instituttet for Sammenlignende Kulturforskning, Serie C I-2. Oslo. 
 
 Strand, Richard F. (2001) The tongues of Peristân. Appendix 1, pp 251–257 in Gates of Peristan: History, Religion and Society in the Hindu Kush, Reports and memoirs, edited by Alberto M Cacopardo and Augusto S Cacopardo. Rome: IsIAO.
 The Languages Of Pakistan, Badshah Munir Bukhari. London

External links

 Phalula Community Welfare Organization, contains various materials in and about the language
 Liljegren PhD dissertation full text
 Palula research (Henrik Liljegren)
 Palulaforskning 
 Palula phonology
 Palula morphology
 Palula sample text
 Anjuman-e-taraqqi-e-Palula
 Georg Morgenstierne multimedia database
 
 
 
 
 
 Henrik Liljegren. (2019). dictionaria/palula: Palula Dictionary (Version v1.0) [Data set]. Zenodo. 

Dardic languages
Languages of Chitral
Languages of Khyber Pakhtunkhwa